Mir-Mostafa Khan was the khan of the Talysh Khanate from 1786 to 1814. He was the son and successor of Jamal al-Din Khan. He was succeeded by his son Mir-Hasan Khan.

References

Sources 
 
 

People of Qajar Iran
18th-century births
1814 deaths
Qajar governors
People of the Russo-Persian Wars
Talysh Khanate
18th-century Iranian people
19th-century Iranian people